Jonathan Tomlinson (born 1 July 1982) is a Welsh international lawn bowler.

Bowls career
In 2011 he won the singles silver medal at the Atlantic Bowls Championships.

He competed for Wales in the men's triples at the 2014 Commonwealth Games where he won a bronze medal. Four years later he was selected as part of the Welsh team for the 2018 Commonwealth Games on the Gold Coast in Queensland

He was the Welsh National singles champion in 2015 and pairs winner in 2019.

In 2019 he won the fours bronze medal at the Atlantic Bowls Championships and in 2020 he was selected for the 2020 World Outdoor Bowls Championship in Australia. In 2022, he competed in the men's triples, where he won a bronze medal and the men's fours at the 2022 Commonwealth Games.

Family
His father John was the 1995 Welsh champion and his brother Ross is an international bowler and the 2010 Welsh champion.

References

1982 births
Living people
Bowls players at the 2010 Commonwealth Games
Bowls players at the 2014 Commonwealth Games
Bowls players at the 2022 Commonwealth Games
Commonwealth Games bronze medallists for Wales
Welsh male bowls players
Sportspeople from Neath
Commonwealth Games medallists in lawn bowls
Medallists at the 2014 Commonwealth Games
Medallists at the 2022 Commonwealth Games